Colegio Particular Subvencionado San Esteban is a Chilean high school located in San Fernando, Colchagua Province, Chile.

References 

Educational institutions established in 1998
Secondary schools in Chile
Schools in Colchagua Province
1998 establishments in Chile